Jill Holterman (born 11 September 1991 in Zaandam) is a Dutch long-distance runner.

Jill Holterman qualified herself on 18 April 2021 in the Enschede Marathon for the 2020 Olympics with a personal best of 2h28:18.

References

External links
 

1991 births
Living people
Dutch female long-distance runners
Dutch female marathon runners
Sportspeople from Zaanstad
Athletes (track and field) at the 2020 Summer Olympics
Olympic athletes of the Netherlands
21st-century Dutch women